This is a list of international football games played by the Slovenia national football team from 2020 to present.

Fixtures and results
Key

2020

2021

2022

2023

Notes

References

External links

Slovenia national football team results